Bromus benekenii is a species of grass in the family Poaceae.

Its native range is Northwestern Africa, Europe to China.

References

benekenii